SWL may refer to:

 Shortwave listening, to radio
 Sound power level
 Socialist Workers League, Israel
 Stillwater - Westport Line, New Zealand railway
 Swale railway station, in Kent, England
 State-Wide League, an alternate name for the Tasmanian Football League
 Safe working load, of lifting equipment